Ján Dzúrik (born 18 July 1993) is a Slovak football midfielder who currently plays for FK Humenné in 2. Liga.

Club career

1. FC Tatran Prešov
Dzúrik made his Fortuna Liga debut for Tatran Prešov in an away against Ružomberok on 16 July 2016. The match concluded in a 1:0 defeat for Tatran, following a goal by Martin Chrien. Dzurík had completed the entire game.

References

External links
 1. FC Tatran Prešov official club profile
 Fortuna Liga profile
 
 Eurofotbal profile
 Futbalnet profile

1993 births
Living people
Sportspeople from Prešov
Slovak footballers
Slovakia youth international footballers
Association football midfielders
1. FC Tatran Prešov players
Partizán Bardejov players
FK Pohronie players
FK Humenné players
Slovak Super Liga players
2. Liga (Slovakia) players